The Roosevelt River (Rio Roosevelt, sometimes Rio Teodoro) is a Brazilian river, a tributary of the Aripuanã River about  in length.

Course

The Roosevelt River begins in the state of Rondônia and flows north through tropical rainforest. It is fed by the Capitão Cardoso River, which meets it at the state boundary.
In Mato Grosso the river forms the western boundary of the  Guariba-Roosevelt Extractive Reserve, a sustainable use unit created in 1996.
After entering Amazonas the river forms the border between the  Manicoré State Forest, a sustainable use conservation unit created in 2005 and the  Guariba State Park, also created in 2005.
The river then runs through the Campos Amazônicos National Park, a  protected area created in 2006 that holds an unusual enclave of cerrado vegetation in the Amazon rainforest.
It continues north until it joins the Aripuanã River.
The Aripuanã then flows into the Madeira River, thence into the Amazon.

History and exploration

Formerly called Rio da Dúvida (“River of Doubt”), the river is named after Theodore Roosevelt, who traveled into the central region of Brazil during the Roosevelt–Rondon Scientific Expedition of 1913–14. The expedition, led by Roosevelt and Cândido Rondon, Brazil's most famous explorer and the river's discoverer, sought to determine where and by which course the river flowed into the Amazon.

Roosevelt and his son Kermit undertook the adventure after the former U.S. president's failed attempt to regain the office as the "Bull Moose" candidate in 1912.  The Roosevelt-Rondon expedition was the first non Amazonian-native party to travel and record what Rondon had named the "Rio da Dúvida", then one of the most unexplored and intimidating tributaries of the Amazon.  Sections of the river have impassable rapids and waterfalls, which hindered the expedition.

Roosevelt later wrote Through the Brazilian Wilderness recounting the adventure. After Roosevelt returned doubts were raised on his account of the expedition. Roosevelt promptly rebutted them in a public forum in Washington, D.C., sponsored by the National Geographic Society.  In 1927 British explorer George Miller Dyott led a second trip down the river, independently confirming Roosevelt's discoveries.

In 1992 a third (modern) expedition was organized, funded, and led by Charles Haskell and Elizabeth McKnight of New Century Conservation Trust, a non-profit environmental education organization in Maine, and sponsored in part by the Theodore Roosevelt Association, the American Museum of Natural History, and the National Wildlife Federation.
This expedition consisted of a total of twenty persons including professional river guides Joe Willie Jones, Kelley Kalafatich, Jim Slade, and Mike Boyle, photographers Carr Clifton and Mark Greenberg, cinematographer Joe Kaminsky, Haskell's son Charles 'Chip' Haskell Jr. who served as the expedition's communications expert, Brazilian scientists Geraldo Mendes dos Santos and João Ferraz (ichthyologist and pharmacologist), and chiefs Oita Mina and Tatataré of the Cinta Larga tribe whose land borders much of the river.  The expedition took 33 days to complete the nearly 1000-mile journey.  While the Roosevelt-Rondon Expedition had to portage almost all of the many rapids on the river with their heavy dugout canoes, the Haskel-McKnight Expedition was able to safely navigate all of the rapids except for one which was portaged. Haskell reported that his expedition "found spots chronicled by the original team, saw plants and insects they described, and went down the rapids that crushed the dugout canoes of 1914". The expedition members were awarded the Theodore Roosevelt Association's Distinguished Service Medal for their achievement. A documentary of the expedition was subsequently produced and aired on PBS called the "New Explorers: The River of Doubt" narrated by Bill Kurtis and Wilford Brimley. Since this time, the expedition has inspired others to undergo its challenges such as Materials Scientist Professor Marc A. Meyers, Col Huram Reis, Col Ivan Angonese, and Jeffery Lehmann.

Inhabitants 
The upper reaches of the Roosevelt River are inhabited by the Cinta Larga people, who were first contacted in the 1960s. The Roosevelt Indigenous Reserve (reserva Roosevelt) was created in 1973 and is managed by FUNAI, occupies , and has a population of 1,200.

References

Sources

External links
Through the Brazilian Wilderness

Rivers of Amazonas (Brazilian state)
Rivers of Mato Grosso
Rivers of Rondônia